Murph may refer to:

People

Nickname
 Erwin Chamberlain (1915–1986), Canadian National Hockey League player
 Marvin Leonard Goldberger (1922–2014), American theoretical physicist and former president of Caltech
 Murph Harrold, poker player inducted into the Poker Hall of Fame in 1984
 Matthew Murphy (born 1984), English rock singer and musician with The Wombats
 Michael P. Murphy (1976-2005), United States Navy SEAL officer posthumously awarded the Medal of Honor
 Mike Murphy (sports radio personality) (born 1951), American talk show host

Other
 Simona Hunyadi Murph, Romanian-American scientist, engineer and inventor
 Murph (drummer), a stage name of American musician Emmett Jefferson Murphy III (born 1964)

Fictional characters
 Dale Murphy, in the nonfiction book The Perfect Storm and the 2000 film adaptation
 Murphy Cooper, in the 2014 science fiction film Interstellar
 Murph, keyboardist of the band reformed in the 1980 film The Blues Brothers
 Murphy Savage, in the 1958 war film Imitation General
 Murph, a main character in the novel The Yellow Birds

Other uses
 Murph, an event in the CrossFit Games, named in honor of Michael P. Murphy

See also 
 Morph (disambiguation)
 Murphy (disambiguation)
 Jack Roland Murphy (born 1938), American jewel thief, surfing champion, musician, author, artist and convicted murderer known as "Murph the Surf"

Lists of people by nickname